Steamboat Rock State Park is a  Washington state park located near the north end of Banks Lake in the Grand Coulee. During the last ice age, the monolith stood as an island in the new bed of the Columbia River where it had been diverted by ice dams. Once the dams burst creating massive floods and the Scablands, the Columbia returned to its original course, leaving Steamboat Rock as a prominent feature of the dry Grand Coulee.

Activities and amenities
The park has  of shoreline and is open year-round for camping and day use. The park has trails for hiking, biking, and equestrian use as well as water activities including boating, swimming, waterskiing, and fishing. Winter activities include cross-country skiing, ice fishing, and ice climbing.

References

External links

Steamboat Rock State Park Washington State Parks and Recreation Commission 
Steamboat Rock State Park Map Washington State Parks and Recreation Commission

Parks in Grant County, Washington
State parks of Washington (state)
Buttes of Washington (state)